Fostaina is a village in the municipal unit of Olenia, Achaea, Greece. It is located in low hills, 3 km south of Lousika and 8 km southeast of Kato Achaia. Fostaina had a population of 219 in 2011, with the majority of Albanian descent.

Population

See also
List of settlements in Achaea

References

External links
 Fostaina GTP Travel Pages

Olenia
Populated places in Achaea